A Mahdavi is an adherent of Mahdavia, a Mahdi'ist Muslim denomination. It may also refer to:

Places
Shahid Mahdavi Stadium, a stadium in Bushehr, Iran
Shahrak-e Mahdavi, a village in Fars, Iran

People
An Iranian surname:
 Ahmad Mahdavi Damghani, Iranian scholar
 Justine Harun-Mahdavi (born 1945), German writer
 Mohammad-Reza Mahdavi Kani (1931–2014), Iranian ayatollah/monarch
 Mohammad Reza Mahdavi (born 1972), Iranian footballer
 Mohammad Reza Mahdavi (born 1981), Iranian footballer

See also
Mahdist (disambiguation)

Iranian-language surnames